Matane is a town on the Gaspé Peninsula in Quebec, Canada, on the south shore of the Saint Lawrence River at the mouth of the Matane River. The town is the seat for the La Matanie Regional County Municipality.

In addition to Matane itself, the town's territory also includes the communities of Petit-Matane and Saint-Luc-de-Matane.

There is a ferry service which crosses the river to Baie-Comeau and Godbout on the north shore as well as a rail ferry service to Baie-Comeau and Sept-Îles.

Etymology
The name Matane was first assigned to the river by Samuel de Champlain as "Mantanne" in 1603. Its meaning is open to different interpretations, with the most common one being that it comes from the Mi'kmaq word mtctan meaning "beaver pond", since the region had an abundant beaver population. It could also be a Maliseet word for "spinal cord", referring to the course of the Matane River; or from the word Mattawa/Matawin, meaning "meeting of the waters". Finally, it could be an abbreviation of the word matandipives, meaning "shipwreck".

History

In 1603, Samuel de Champlain visited the area and considered the location as "pleasant enough". In 1616 merchants known as the Rochelais from La Rochelle were the first Europeans to spend the winter. Matane was used as a trading post for the Rochelais who were exchanging European goods for furs with the Mi'kmaq people. In 1672, the land on both sides of the Matane River was granted as a seignory to Mathieu D'Amours, which led to the first settlements shortly after. The Mi'kmaq people lived there until 1845.

In 1845, the place was first incorporated as the Municipality of Matane, but dissolved two years later. In 1855, it was reestablished as the Parish Municipality of Saint-Jérôme-de-Matane, named after the local parish. In 1893, the main population centre at the mouth of the Matane River separated from the parish municipality and was incorporated as the Village Municipality of Saint-Jérôme-de-Matane, which changed status and name to City of Matane in 1937 when city status was granted.

After World War II, Matane merchants decided to strengthen their economic and maritime bonds with the North side of the Saint Lawrence River. They ran a service of a regular ferry in 1962. In 1978 a train ferry system was in place.

On September 26, 2001, the neighbouring municipalities of Petit-Matane, Saint-Luc-de-Matane, and Saint-Jérôme-de-Matane were amalgamated into the Town of Matane.

Tourism
Since Matane is the first step to Gaspé's tourist circuit it receives and accommodates many passing tourists. The old lighthouse of Matane was transformed into a tourist information centre with a panoramic view of its surroundings.

The Matane River is known as the "River-School" in Quebec because so many people learn to fish there. The river itself is 101 km in length and is the only place in Quebec where you can fish in the town square.

A number of people from Matane and the area are well known locally or internationally, including artist Claude Picher and NHL players such as Yves Racine. There are a number of art galleries in Matane that support local talent.

In 2000 Matane was named East Quebec's industrial capital.

Districts
The town is divided in 4 districts that match the former municipalities before amalgamation in 2001:
District 1 - Matane
District 2 - Saint-Jérome-de-Matane
District 3 - Petit-Matane
District 4 - Saint-Luc-de-Matane

Demographics 

Population trend:

 Population total in 2001: 14,948
 Matane (ville): 11,635
 Petit-Matane (municipality): 1365
 Saint-Jérôme-de-Matane (parish municipality): 1154
 Saint-Luc-de-Matane (municipality): 839

 Population in 1996:
 Matane (ville): 12,364
 Petit-Matane (municipality): 1360
 Saint-Jérôme-de-Matane (parish municipality): 1165
 Saint-Luc-de-Matane (municipality): 899

Mother tongue:
 English as first language: 0.5%
 French as first language: 98.5%
 English and French as first language: 0.4%
 Other as first language: 0.5%

Industry
Matane has a diversified economy. The city is known for its shrimp, which are processed there: the northern prawn (known locally as crevettes de Matane) are renowned throughout the world for their high quality. Recent advances in wind power have also helped raise awareness of the region. Matane has the largest wind farm in Quebec in addition to having two windmill manufacturing plants: Marmen and Enercon.

The city also has a Sappi factory in the field of pulp and paper (separated thermochemical pulp). There is also a pork product processing plant: Les Cuisines gaspésiennes, which exports to the United States and China. Matane also has a shipyard and a large concrete pipe factory, Béton Provincial, and a sawmill.

Matane was also home of the first Dollarama wich open in April 1992. The former Larry Rossy chain decided to transform its banner into Dollarama and, with the success of the Matane store, the management decided to change all the Larry Rossy banners into Dolloramas.

See also 
 COGEMA
 List of cities in Quebec
 Société des traversiers du Québec

References

External links

 
Cities and towns in Quebec